The Shigar Fort (Balti and ) means The Fort on Rock is an old fort of Baltistan and Pakistan located in the town of Shigar. It was built in the 17th century by the Raja of Amacha Dynasty of Shigar. 

The fort has been restored by Aga Khan Cultural Service Pakistan (AKCSP-P), the Pakistan arm of the Aga Khan Historic Cities Programme. After restoration, the Fort was converted to a museum and luxury hotel managed by Serena Hotels. The restoration process took place from 1999 to 2004 and cost approximately US$1.4 million.

See also 

Altit Fort
Baltit Fort
Khaplu Fort
List of forts in Pakistan
List of museums in Pakistan

References 

Forts in Gilgit-Baltistan
History of Baltistan
Restoration of historic architecture in Pakistan